Bat-Ölzii (Firm bless) is a sum (district) of Övörkhangai Province in southern Mongolia.  In 2008, its population was 6,189.

References 

Districts of Övörkhangai Province